Biesiadecki (feminine: Biesiadecka; Biesiadeccy) is a Polish-language surname. Notable people with the surname include:

Alfred Biesiadecki (1839–1889), Polish pathologist
Piet Biesiadecki (1920–2000), American bobsledder 

Polish-language surnames